An Ordinary Miracle is a Soviet 1978 romantic fantasy musical film directed by Mark Zakharov and based on a play by Evgeny Schwartz. This is the second adaptation of the play; the first one was filmed in 1964 by Erast Garin.

Plot
The protagonist of the film, the Wizard (Oleg Yankovsky), invents a fairy tale to amuse himself and his wife (Irina Kupchenko). The tale's characters come to life, come to his house and set out to live their lives. 
 
Many years ago, the Wizard came up with a "reverse" fairy tale, turning a bear into a human (Aleksandr Abdulov), who would transform back into a bear as soon as a princess falls in love with him and kisses him. Now, the young man returns to the Wizard's house where he meets a beautiful girl (Yevgeniya Simonova), and they immediately fall in love with each other. To his dismay, she turns out to be a princess – the Wizard made it so that a king (Yevgeny Leonov) who was just passing by with his daughter and his suite felt a sudden urge to stop by the estate. When the Princess, clueless about the young man's origin, wants to kiss him, he flees in horror.
 
The Princess hurries after him, dressed as a boy. They meet in a tavern called "Emilia", but the Bear, unable to recognize the Princess, summons her to a duel. However, when the Princess cries out "Daddy" during the battle, the Bear realizes that she deceived him.
 
In anger, he goes to the innkeeper (Yury Solomin) and begs to be to locked up, as the tavern is covered with snow and it is impossible to get out. The innkeeper gives him the key to a room. He draws his attention to one of the court ladies and recognizes in her his first love Emilia, in whose honor he named the inn. The innkeeper and Emilia decide to help the quarreled lovers.
 
The Princess locks herself in a room on the second floor of the inn and promises to shoot anyone who would come to her. The King orders to draw lots and the lot comes out for the court Minister Administrator (Andrei Mironov). The Administrator comes to the Princess, and a shot rings out – leaving behind the Princess, the administrator shoots her, but misses. The Princess angrily decides to marry the first courter and announces the Administrator to be her fiancé.
 
The King decides to play a wedding. Desperate, his love taken away from him, the Bear decides to tell all about the princess kiss that would turn him into a beast, but the Princess rejects him.
 
The wedding procession leaves. The Hunter (Vsevolod Larionov) and the Bear remain in the tavern. The Wizard appears and tells the Bear that he was disappointed in his behavior. He calls the Bear a coward. In the opinion of the Wizard the Bear should have kissed the princess. The fact that he didn't do that shows that he does not love the princess so much as to sacrifice his human form. The Bear and the Hunter make an agreement under which, if ever the Bear is to kiss the Princess and to turn into an animal, the Hunter will kill him.
 
Exactly one year passes by. The country is actually ruled by the Administrator instead of the King. The Princess is slowly dying of longing for the Bear. The Wizard intentionally does not let the Bear in the country and into his house, because he thinks that the tale with a sad end has much more to teach people, and stories with a happy ending are just for children.
 
As the Princess feels death coming, the Bear appears in the house of the Wizard. The Hunter is aiming the gun at the Bear. The Bear kisses the princess, but does not turn into a bear, and stays a man. The Wizard explains this paradox to be an ordinary miracle.
 
The characters leave the Wizard's house that turns out to be all scenery. The decorations burn and the Wizard is left alone.

Cast 
 Aleksandr Abdulov as the Bear
Oleg Yankovsky as the Wizard
Yevgeny Leonov as the King
 Yevgeniya Simonova as the Princess
Irina Kupchenko as the Wizard's wife
 Andrei Mironov as the Minister Administrator
 Yekaterina Vasilyeva as Emilia the First Lady (singing by Larisa Dolina; sole singing by Yelena Charkviani)
 Yury Solomin as Emil the Innkeeper (singing by Leonid Serebrennikov)
Yervand Arzumanian as the First Minister
Vsevolod Larionov as the Hunter
Andrei Leonov as the Hunter's student
Vladimir Dolinsky as the Executioner

External links

1978 films
1978 romantic comedy films
1970s fantasy comedy films
Films scored by Gennady Gladkov
Soviet films based on plays
Films based on works by Evgeny Shvarts
Films directed by Mark Zakharov
Mosfilm films
1970s romantic musical films
Russian fantasy films
Soviet fantasy films
1970s Russian-language films
Soviet musical films
Russian musical films